Moto G5 (stylized as moto g5) is a series of Android smartphones developed by Motorola Mobility, a subsidiary of Lenovo. It is the fifth generation of the Moto G family. Announced as successors to the Moto G4, they were first released in March 2017 in several markets including India and Europe. The original variants are the Moto G5 and Moto G5 Plus, the latter also being available as an Amazon Prime version in the United States. The mid-cycle updates, the Moto G5s and Moto G5s Plus, were released in August 2017.

Specifications
The Moto G5's design was changed, featuring an aluminum casing and flush-mounted camera. The device is available in "lunar gray" and "fine gold" colors, and unlike previous generations is not customizable via MotoMaker. The G5 includes a 1080p display, an octa-core Qualcomm Snapdragon system-on-chip, 2, 3 or 4 GB of RAM, and 16 or 32 GB of internal storage. A dedicated MicroSDXC memory slot is available, supporting up to 128 GB memory expansion. Like previous generations, the device supports gesture and motion controls through Moto Actions. It has a 12- or 13-megapixel rear-facing camera and a 5-megapixel front-facing camera. The device ships with Android 7.0 "Nougat". It features the same TurboPower charging as the G4, providing up to 6 hours of battery life with 15 minutes of charge time. A fingerprint reader is integrated in the home button on the front of the device.

Variants
The Moto G5 is the standard variant; and the Moto G5 Plus is a premium variant with improved specifications but a non-replaceable battery. The Moto G5 Plus will not be released in Canada, according to Mobile Syrup. The regular G5 is not available to purchase in the United States

The Moto G5 Plus was released in the United States and internationally; all Plus models apart from American ones have NFC-contactless payment as a feature, but not compasses; US models have the opposite configuration. 

As with the previous generation of Moto G4 devices, online retailer Amazon.com offers a 'Prime Exclusive' version of the Moto G5 Plus for Amazon Prime members, which is cheaper than the standard version and features Amazon advertisements on the lock screen.

Unlike the previous generation, the 2800 mAh battery of the basic Moto G5 variant is user-replaceable.

The 'Prime Exclusive' devices hardware is identical; however, unlike most other recent Motorola Android devices, their bootloaders cannot be unlocked, thereby precluding users from installing custom firmware.

Model Comparison

Moto G5S and G5S Plus 
On 1 August 2017, Motorola unveiled the 'special edition' Moto G5S and Moto G5S Plus. These also have an aluminum unibody design. The specifications of the Moto G5S include a non-replaceable 3,000 mAh battery, a 1080p 5.2-inch display, 16 MP rear camera, the same 5 MP front camera with flash and a 1.4 GHz octa-core processor. On the other hand, the G5S Plus features 5.5-inch display, Snapdragon 2.0 GHz processor, and a new 13 MP dual-lens camera setup. Both versions support a fingerprint sensor. Both devices are upgradable to Android Oreo 8.1.0.

Reception
The Moto G5 lineup received positive reviews, although many considered that the regular G5 (low-end model) was not a true successor to the Moto G4 in terms of its features and CPU performance (the G5 used the 1.4 GHz Snapdragon 430, whilst the G4 used the 1.5 GHz Snapdragon 617). The Moto G5 was regarded as a disappointment by Alphr, saying previous Moto G phones had been considered the best budget phones at the time of their respective release. On the other hand, the G5 Plus and G5S Plus (and to a lesser extent, the G5S) were praised for their large improvements in performance, battery life, camera quality, and storage capacity. Android Central thought that the G5S Plus was not a significant upgrade over the G5 Plus, finding that while the G5S Plus adds an upgraded front-facing camera with LED flash and a metal unibody, its rear camera module they considered a regression from that of the G5 Plus due to a narrower aperture (F2.0 versus F1.7).

See also
Comparison of smartphones

References

Further information
Android Authority Review (G5 Plus)

External links

Product Website

Android (operating system) devices
Mobile phones introduced in 2017
Mobile phones with multiple rear cameras
Mobile phones with user-replaceable battery
Motorola smartphones